Van Hien may refer to:

People
Henry van Hien (1857 or 1858 — 1928), Gold Coast (British colony) merchant, politician, and nationalist leader
Nguyễn Văn Hiến (born 1954), Admiral, and Vice Minister of Defense in Vietnam

Places
Đại Nam Văn Hiến, a tourism complex in Bình Dương Province, Vietnam
Roller Coaster (Dai Nam Van Hien), a steel roller coaster located at Đại Nam Văn Hiến in Bình Dương, Vietnam
Văn Hiến University, a university in Ho Chi Minh City, Vietnam